Saleh Khoulef (born March 30, 1975) is an Egyptian boxer., He competed in the light welterweight division at the 2000 Summer Olympics. During the competition, he defeated Ukraine's Vyacheslav Senchenko in the second round, but was eliminated in the subsequent round.

References

1975 births
Living people
Olympic boxers of Egypt
Boxers at the 2000 Summer Olympics
Boxers at the 2004 Summer Olympics
Welterweight boxers
Egyptian male boxers